Mehdi Tahiri (born 28 July 1977) is a retired Moroccan tennis player. Tahiri represented Morocco in the Davis Cup in several years from 1993 to 2006.

Junior Grand Slam finals

Singles: 1 (1 runner-up)

ATP Challenger and ITF Futures finals

Singles: 11 (6–5)

Doubles: 4 (1–3)

References

External links
 
 
 

1977 births
Living people
Moroccan male tennis players
Mediterranean Games bronze medalists for Morocco
Mediterranean Games medalists in tennis
Competitors at the 2001 Mediterranean Games
21st-century Moroccan people
20th-century Moroccan people